Isis Bridge is a modern road bridge across the River Thames just south of Oxford, England.

The bridge was built in the 1960s and opened to road traffic in 1965 when the section of the ring road between South Hinksey and Heyford Hill was opened.  It is a single arch structure, built of 5,000m² steel by British Constructional Steelwork Association for Oxfordshire County Council who are responsible for its maintenance. The bridge required a full wet and dry blast and coating system to the steelwork in 2003 when it was also strengthened.

See also
Crossings of the River Thames

References

Bridges across the River Thames
Bridges completed in 1965
Bridges in Oxford